Chief Zabu is a long-unreleased film that was written, produced and directed by Neil Cohen and Zack Norman (under his birth name, Howard Zuker). It is a socio-political comedy about a New York real estate developer who tries to take over a Polynesian nation. The film stars Norman, Allen Garfield and Allan Arbus as New York businessmen trying to take over a newly independent Polynesian nation. Production began in 1986 but, due to various issues, Cohen and Norman were unable to complete the film until 2016. It premiered at Laemmle Theatres' Monica Film Center on October 28, 2016 and screened a week later, on November 7, at the Fort Lauderdale International Film Festival ("FLIFF"). Trailers and clips are available through both Vimeo and YouTube. On August 16, 2017, Zabu's co-writer/directors were pictured on the front page of the New York Times Arts Section with a history of the film's unique and unusual journey.

A long running advertisement for the film in Variety was the source of a recurring joke on Mystery Science Theater 3000.

Synopsis 
The film follows an ambitious New York realtor who dreams of political power and decides to accomplish this by taking over a Polynesian nation.

Cast 
Allen Garfield as Ben Sydney
Zack Norman as Sammy Brooks
Allan Arbus as George Dankworth
Marianna Hill as Jennifer Holding
Manu Tupou as Chief Henri Zabu
Ed Lauter as Skip Keisel
Joseph Warren as Arthur Keisel
Betty Karlen as Linda Gato
Shirley Stoler as Joan Ironwood
Lucianne Buchanan as Monica Keisel
Ferdinand Mayne as Seth the Butler
Charles Siegal as Seth's Assistant
Tom Nardini as the Gatekeeper
Harsh Nayyar as the Prime Minister

Merchandise
At his TeePublic website, American entrepreneur Josh Abramson offers a T-shirt bearing an image of the Variety advertisement that ran consistently between 1985 and 1988.

Reception
Sheri Linden of The Hollywood Reporter gave the film a positive review, calling it "A comic time capsule with a timeless punch." Contrastingly, Michael Rechtshaffen of the Los Angeles Times called it a "tiresomely talky would-be satire" that "plays like bargain basement Barry Levinson".

In anticipation of the film's screening at FLIFF, a Fort Lauderdale restaurant introduced a  specialty cocktail named the "Chief Zabu".

Following a series of festival and awards-qualifying screening runs, blogger Chad Sternberger of the popular website The Studio Exec implored Hollywood distributors: "For heaven's sake could someone please release Chief Zabu." The film was one of 336 titles to qualify for the 89th Academy Awards.

Actress Marianna Hill, one of the stars of the film, spoke at length about her experience working on Chief Zabu on the movie/TV blog "Hill Place".

References

External links
 
 

English-language films
Unreleased American films